Pieta is an unincorporated community in Mendocino County, California.

A post office operated at Pieta from 1891 to 1897. The name honors a local Native American chief.

References

Unincorporated communities in California
Unincorporated communities in Mendocino County, California